Band of Thieves is a 1928 German silent film directed by Hans Behrendt and starring Paul Hörbiger, Leonhard Frank and Gustl Gstettenbaur. The film's sets were designed by the art director Oscar Friedrich Werndorff. It was distributed by the German branch of Fox Film.

Cast

References

Bibliography

External links 

1928 films
Films of the Weimar Republic
Films directed by Hans Behrendt
German silent feature films
Films based on German novels
Films with screenplays by Franz Schulz
German black-and-white films
Fox Film films